The following is about the qualification rules and the quota allocation for the biathlon at the 2014 Winter Olympics.

Quota allocation
A total quota of 220 athletes are allowed at the Games (113 men and 107 women). Countries are assigned quotas using a combination of the Nation Cup scores of their top 3 athletes in the individual, sprint, and relay competitions at the 2012 in Ruhpolding, Germany and 2013 World Championships in Nové Město na Moravě, Czech Republic.

An athlete also must meet requirements before competing:
During the 2012/13 or 2013/14 Biathlon World Cup season the athlete must have two results at IBU Cup, Open European Championships, World Championships or World Cup in the Sprint or Individual that at a maximum is 20% behind the average time of the top three athletes. Or, two placings in the top half at the Junior World Championships. They also can have a combination of both criteria (one of each). All relay members must meet this requirement as well.

If a nation rejects a quota spot, it will go to nations 28 (for women) and 29 (for men) and so on until all quotas have been distributed. A country qualifying more the four athletes must lower their teams to three or less athletes to have redistribution had effect, considering countries that reject a quota spot from five to four athletes can still start the maximum of four athletes in any event (with 88 for men and 87 for women being the maximum number of starters an event can have).

Qualification table by country

 Canada qualified five athletes per gender, but elected to only send four.
 Finland qualified five athletes per gender, but elected to only send two.
 Slovakia qualified five athletes per gender, but elected to only send four.
 Sweden qualified five female athletes, but elected to send none.
 Austria qualified four women but decided to send only three.

Qualification standings
Below are the final official standings. Countries not qualified can still qualify pending reallocation.

Men

Women

Denmark's points consists of athletes from Greenland, an autonomous country within the Kingdom of Denmark.

References

External links
World Championships results + Nations cup scores

Qualification for the 2014 Winter Olympics
Qualification